The submandibular duct or Wharton duct or submaxillary duct, is one of the salivary excretory ducts. It is about 5 cm. long, and its wall is much thinner than that of the parotid duct. It drains saliva from each bilateral submandibular gland and sublingual gland to the sublingual caruncle in the floor of the mouth.

Structure 

The submandibular duct arises from deep part of submandibular gland, a salivary gland. It begins by numerous branches from the superficial surface of the gland, and runs forward between the mylohyoid, hyoglossus, and genioglossus muscles. It then passes between the sublingual gland and the genioglossus and opens by a narrow opening on the summit of a small papilla (the "sublingual caruncle") at the side of the frenulum of the tongue. It lies superior to lingual and hypoglossal nerves.

Variation 
The submandibular duct may be duplicated on one side or both sides, creating an accessory submandibular duct. Rarely, it may not perforate into the mouth.

Function 
The submandibular ducts drain saliva from the submandibular gland, and the sublingual glands to the sublingual caruncles in the floor of the mouth

Clinical significance

Sialolithiasis 
The submandibular duct may be affected by stones, known as sialolithiasis. These may grow large, requiring surgery to remove. Simple palpation may be used to identify the location of any stones before surgery.

Imperforate 
Rarely, the submandibular duct may not perforate into the mouth. Surgery may be used to repair this birth defect.

Drooling 
The exit of the submandibular gland into the mouth may be realigned in patients who drool. This redirects the exiting saliva away from the vestibule and the lips. This surgery has a fairly high success rate. Rarely, the submandibular gland may need to be removed on one or both sides.

History 
The submandibular duct was initially described by the English anatomist Thomas Wharton ( 1614-73) and is sometimes referred to by his name.

References

External links 
 
 

Glands of mouth
Saliva